This article lists the squads for the 2019 Algarve Cup, the 26th edition of the Algarve Cup. The cup consisted of a series of friendly games, and was held in the Algarve region of Portugal from 27 February to 6 March 2019. The twelve national teams involved in the tournament registered a squad of 23 players.

The age listed for each player is as of 27 February 2019, the first day of the tournament. The numbers of caps and goals listed for each player do not include any matches played after the start of tournament. The club listed is the club for which the player last played a competitive match prior to the tournament. The nationality for each club reflects the national association (not the league) to which the club is affiliated. A flag is included for coaches that are of a different nationality than their own national team.

Group A

Canada
Coach:  Kenneth Heiner-Møller

The squad was announced on 16 February 2019.

Iceland
Coach: Jón Þór Hauksson

The squad was announced on 15 February 2019.

Scotland
Coach: Shelley Kerr

The squad was announced on 13 February 2019. Zoe Ness replaced Emma Mitchell after her withdrawal from the squad.

Group B

Netherlands
Coach: Sarina Wiegman

The squad was announced on 20 February 2019. Victoria Pelova sustained a shoulder injury during training on 28 February 2019 and was replaced by Siri Worm. On 2 March 2019, Stefanie van der Gragt was replaced by Katja Snoeijs.

Poland
Coach: Miłosz Stępiński

The squad was announced on 19 February 2019. On 25 February 2019, Anna Rędzia withdrew due to injury and was replaced by Klaudia Olejniczak. On 28 February 2019, Jolanta Siwińska withdrew due to injury and was replaced by Dagmara Grad.

Spain
Coach: Jorge Vilda

The squad was announced on 18 February 2019. On 24 February 2019, Amanda Sampedro and Andrea Falcón withdrew due to injury and were replaced by Olga García and Aitana Bonmatí.

Group C

China
Coach: Jia Xiuquan

The squad was announced on 26 February 2019.

Denmark
Coach: Lars Søndergaard

The squad was announced on 12 February 2019. On 19 February 2019, Nanna Christiansen withdrew due to injury and was replaced by Julie Tavlo Petersson. On 24 February 2019, Rikke Sevecke withdrew due to injury and was replaced by Emilie Henriksen. Katrine Veje withdrew due to injury and was replaced by Cecilie Sandvej.

Norway
Coach:  Martin Sjögren

The squad was announced on 13 February 2019. On 24 February 2019, Kristine Minde withdrew from the squad and was replaced by Heidi Elisabeth Ellingsen.

Group D

Portugal
Coach: Francisco Neto

The squad was announced on 21 February 2019. On 4 March 2019, Carolina Mendes withdrew and was replaced by Laura Luís.

Sweden
Coach: Peter Gerhardsson

The squad was announced on 11 February 2019.

Switzerland
Coach:  Nils Nielsen

The squad was announced on 9 February 2019. On 22 February 2019, Viola Calligaris, Seraina Friedli, and Julia Stierli withdrew due to injuries and were replaced by Carola Fasel and Lesley Ramseier.

Player representation

By club
Clubs with 5 or more players represented are listed.

By club nationality

By club federation

By representatives of domestic league

References

2019 squads
squad